Sarah Corina is an English bass guitarist and music producer. She has played bass with The Bomb Party, The Mekons, Bill Carter, Die Cheerleader, and Striplight among others.

Sarah Corina started playing bass as a teenager in Leicester, she joined The Bomb Party as an original member. The Bomb Party enjoyed an amount of critical success appearing in Sounds, Melody Maker and the NME. They regularly toured the UK and Germany, including supporting The Fall and Stiff Little Fingers at the 'WDR1 Rocknacht' in 1989. After recording their first album they released three more studio LPs before disbanding in 1990.

In 1990 she became a founding member of Die Cheerleader, where she helped to create their sound and co-wrote their songs.

Sarah Corina joined the Mekons in 1991 and stayed until 2015, playing bass and touring extensively across America and Europe. She recorded 14 albums with them.

In 2004, with Alex Mitchell (Curve) she formed a new band called Striplight. With Mitchell on guitar, Liz Avey on vocals and Mark Woodgate on drums, Striplight have released four singles and toured the UK. She remained in the band until 2019.

Since 2010, she has been writing solo music.
 Sarah Corina is also currently recording and producing other bands and artists. She recorded and produced Platinum Coils album by The Monochrome Set and Peril/Night album by The Unstoppable Achievers among others.

In 2022 Sarah Corina released 3 singles with Bill Carter (Screaming Blue Messiahs)

Selected discography
Mekons

Striplight
 "Still Beating/8 Inches", 7" Vinyl, STRIP001, 2005
 "Hold It Down, Electrified, Sugar Coated, No Search/No Entry", 12" Vinyl EP, Tummy Touch Records, TUCH129ST, 2006
 "EP2 - The Remixes", 12" Vinyl EP, Tummy Touch Records, TUCH129STX, 2006
 "EP1 & EP2 - The Originals & The Remixes", CD, Tummy Touch Records, TUCH-129stCD, 2006
 "Shoes / Triangles", 7" Vinyl, KOI Records, KOI-024, 2009

The Bomb Party

Singles
 Kiss The Sky (w/ Johnny Dowd), 2021

References

External links
The Mekons Official fan-run website
The Mekons 'industry resource site'
The Mekons collection on the Internet Archive's live music archive

Year of birth missing (living people)
Living people
Alternative rock bass guitarists
English rock bass guitarists
Women bass guitarists
English women in electronic music
The Mekons members